Lizzano may refer to a pair of Italian municipalities:

 Lizzano, Apulia, in the province of Taranto, Apulia.
 Lizzano in Belvedere, in the Metropolitan City of Bologna, Emilia-Romagna.

See also
Lizzana (Garganega), a variety of white Italian wine grape
Lizza (disambiguation)